Parliamentary elections were held in Mali on 24 November 2013. President Ibrahim Boubacar Keïta's party, Rally for Mali, won 66 of the 147 seats in the National Assembly, with its allies winning an additional 49 seats, giving it a substantial majority. The Union for the Republic and Democracy, led by Soumaïla Cissé, won 17 seats, becoming the Opposition.

The elections had originally been planned for 1 and 22 July 2012, but were postponed after the Tuareg Rebellion and the March 2012 coup d'état. A second round of voting was held on 15 December 2013.

Background
Following French intervention in the country's separatist Azawad region, French Foreign Minister Laurent Fabius said that the elections should continue as scheduled and that the number of French forces in the country would be halved. Interim Prime Minister Django Sissoko visited Gao in northern Mali for the first time since the French intervention and rebel takeover in April 2013. He announced that the elections would take place in July and the preparations were under way. However, unnamed analysts suggested botched elections could lead to further unrest. It was later decided to hold the legislative elections a few months after the presidential polls.

Conduct
In July 2013, gunmen abducted two election officials a week before the presidential elections. Two days before the second round of the parliamentary election, two Senegalese MINUSMA peacekeepers were killed in a bombing outside the Malian Solidarity Bank in Kidal. On 15 December, the second round voter turnout was just 38.5%.

Results

In the second round, out of 5,951,838 registered voters, 2,221,283 cast a vote - with 2,122,449 being valid - totalling a 37.32% turnout, according to the Constitutional Court

Aftermath
Issaka Sidibé, an RPM Deputy, was elected as President of the National Assembly on 22 January 2014. He received 115 votes, a large majority; 11 deputies voted instead for Oumar Mariko, while 20 deputies cast blank votes and one deputy cast a spoiled vote.

References
   
   

Elections in Mali
Mali
2013 in Mali
Election and referendum articles with incomplete results